9 O' Clock is a  Hindi film starring Dev Vart Singh, Arun Bakshi, Kashiff Khan and Raju Thakkar. It is directed by Amrit Raj Thakur. The movie was telecast on the channel Enter10 on 10 June 2018.

Synopsis
A team of researchers visits an isolated jungle to find bio-diesel sources and don't return.

Cast
 Arun Bakshi as Nasim
 Kashiff khan as Javed
 Raju Thakkar as Afzal
 Santosh Shrivastav
 Partho Pratim Banerjee
Muskaan Sinha as Ishita

References

External links
 
 

2017 films
2010s Hindi-language films
Indian action films
2017 action films
Hindi-language action films